Dickison is a surname. Notable people with the surname include:

Bruce Dickison, New Zealand former professional rugby league footballer
C. A. Dickison (1878–1965), Mayor of Compton, California 1924–1933
John Jackson Dickison (1816–1902), officer in the Confederate States Army during the American Civil War

See also
Dickinson (disambiguation)
Dickson (disambiguation)
Dikson (disambiguation)